The Republican Main Street Partnership is a 501(c)(4) organization that was allied with the congressional Republican Main Street Caucus. The Partnership continues to exist, but the Caucus was dissolved by its members in February 2019.

History

Formation of the Republican Main Street Partnership
The Chairman Emeritus and Founder of the group was now-deceased former Congressman Amo Houghton of New York.

The Republican Main Street Partnership was formed following the 1994 House elections in which conservative Republicans were swept into power. An informal discussion group formed by representatives Nancy Johnson, Steve Gunderson and Fred Upton later became somewhat of an organized bloc intent on representing the moderate wing of the Republican Party, with the organization describing itself as a "broad alliance of centrist Republicans."

The Republican Main Street Partnership allied with other moderate Republican groups, including Christine Todd Whitman's It's My Party Too, Ann Stone's Republicans for Choice, the Log Cabin Republicans, the Republican Majority for Choice, The Wish List, Republicans for Environmental Protection, the Mainstream Republicans of Washington and the Kansas Traditional Republican Majority.

They were sometimes swing votes on spending bills and as a result have gained influence in Congress out of proportion to their numbers. They are frequently sought after to broker compromises between the Democratic and Republican leadership, generally lending a more center-right character to US politics.

Members of the Republican Main Street Partnership were often challenged in Republican primaries by members from the Club for Growth, FreedomWorks and the Tea Party movement, among others.  The Club for Growth has used the pejorative term RINO (Republicans In Name Only) to describe opponents such as the Republican Main Street Partnership that it feels are not conservative enough. According to the director of the Republican Main Street Partnership, the Club for Growth and its agenda are "not representative of the Republican Party" and the Republican Main Street Partnership "raise[s] money on a daily basis to defeat" members of the Club for Growth.

In 2004, the group attempted to propose changes to moderate the Republican Party's platform regarding abortion and stem-cell research.

Formation of the Republican Main Street Caucus
On September 7, 2017, members formed the Republican Main Street Caucus with Pat Tiberi (OH–12) as Chair. After Tiberi's resignation from the House in 2018, Rodney Davis (IL–13) took over duties as Chair.

Dissolution of the Republican Main Street Caucus
After the 2018 United States House of Representatives elections, the Democratic Party won the majority of the seats in the House of Representatives, gaining a net total of 41 seats from two years prior, their largest gain of House seats in an election since the 1974 elections.

On November 28, 2018, the Republican Main Street Caucus met with the Republican Main Street Partnership to ask why the Partnership's SuperPAC still had $722,000 unspent, rather than spending that money on competitive races to keep its members in office. The Partnership's chief executive officer, Sarah Chamberlain, said that $6million had been spent on 2018 campaigns, and that the remaining $722,000 was set aside for 2020. Members of the Caucus were concerned that Chamberlain's compensation was 20percent of the Partnership's operating expenses.

The following month, the Caucus asked Chamberlain how the Caucus had spent its money to help its members' races. Chamberlain referenced an organization, Women2Women, that was part of the Partnership's network that many Caucus members had never heard of, spurring questions about Chamberlain's leadership. The Caucus voted unanimously to suspend political activity with the Partnership until an independent audit of the Partnership's governance could be conducted. The Partnership declined to be audited, saying it was a private organization, independent of the Caucus, and that the Caucus had no right to request an audit.

The members of the Caucus voted to dissolve itself in February 2019. Some of its members decided to join the bipartisan Problem Solvers Caucus. The Partnership continues to exist.

Board of directors 
 Sarah Chamberlain – President and Chief Executive Officer
 Doug Ose – Board Member, former Representative from California
 Robert Ziff – Board Member
 Tim Regan – Board Member

Current membership

There are currently five U.S. Senators and 66 House Representatives affiliated with the group.

U.S. Senators 
 Shelley Moore Capito (WV)
 Susan Collins (ME)
 Joni Ernst (IA)
 Roger Marshall (KS)
 Todd Young (IN)

U.S. Representatives 

 Don Bacon (NE–02)
 Troy Balderson (OH–12)
 Andy Barr  (KY-06)
 Aaron Bean (FL-04)
 Cliff Bentz (OR-02)
 Stephanie Bice (OK-05)
 Mike Bost (IL–12)
 Larry Bucshon (IN–08)
 Michael C. Burgess (TX-26)
 Ken Calvert (CA-41)
 Lori Chavez-DeRemer (OR-05)
 Juan Ciscomani (AZ-06)
 Dan Crenshaw (TX-02)
 John Curtis (UT–03)
 Monica De La Cruz (TX-15)
 Anthony D'Esposito (NY-04)
 Mario Díaz-Balart (FL–26)
 Tom Emmer (MN–06)
 Jake Ellzey (TX-06)
 Randy Feenstra (IA-04)
 Brian Fitzpatrick (PA–01)
 Mike Gallagher (WI–08)
 Andrew Garbarino (NY-02)
 Carlos Gimenez (FL-26)
 Tony Gonzales (TX-23)
 Jenniffer González Colón (PR–AL)
 Ashley Hinson (IA-01)
 Erin Houchin (IN-09)
 Bill Huizenga (MI–04)
 Bill Johnson (OH–06)
 Dusty Johnson (SD-AL)
 David Joyce (OH–14)
 Tom Kean Jr. (NJ-07)
 Jen Kiggans (VA-02)
 Young Kim (CA-39)
 Nick LaLota (NY-01)
 Nick Langworthy (NY-23)
 Mike Lawler (NY-17)
 Morgan Luttrell (TX-08)
 Nancy Mace (SC-01)
 Nicole Malliotakis (NY-11)
 Lisa McClain (MI-09)
 Michael McCaul (TX-10)
 Cathy McMorris Rodgers (WA–05)
 Dan Meuser (PA-09)
 Max Miller (OH-07)
 Carol Miller (WV–03)
 Mariannette Miller-Meeks (IA-02)
 Marc Molinaro (NY-19)
 John Moolenaar (MI–02)
 Blake Moore (UT-01)
 Nathaniel Moran (TX-01)
 Dan Newhouse (WA–04)
 Jay Obernolte (CA-08)
 Guy Reschenthaler (PA-14)
 John Rutherford (FL–04)
 Maria Elvira Salazar (FL-27)
 Peter Sessions (TX-17)
 Mike Simpson (ID–02)
 Chris Smith (NJ–04)
 Pete Stauber (MN-08)
 Elise Stefanik (NY–21)
 Bryan Steil (WI-01)
 Mike Turner (OH–10)
 David Valadao (CA-21)
 Jeff Van Drew (NJ-02)
 Michael Waltz (FL–06)

Former members

Representatives 
 
 Steve Austria, Ohio (retired in 2012)
 Roscoe Bartlett, Maryland (lost reelection in 2012 following redistricting)
 Charles Bass, New Hampshire (lost reelection in 2012)
 Dan Benishek, Michigan (retired in 2016)
 Doug Bereuter, Nebraska (resigned in 2004)
 Judy Biggert, Illinois (lost reelection in 2012 following redistricting)
 Brian Bilbray, California (lost reelection in 2012)
 Sherwood Boehlert, New York (retired in 2006)
 Mary Bono Mack, California (lost reelection in 2012)
 Jeb Bradley, New Hampshire (lost reelection in 2006)
 Dave Camp, Michigan (retired in 2014)
 Ken Calvert, California (disaffiliated)
 Joseph Cao, Louisiana (lost reelection in 2010)
 Mike Castle, Delaware (retired to unsuccessfully run for United States Senate in 2010)
 Mike Coffman, Colorado (lost reelection in 2018)
 Barbara Comstock, Virginia (lost reelection in 2018)
 Ryan Costello, Pennsylvania (retired in 2018)
 Carlos Curbelo, Florida (lost reelection in 2018)
 Rodney Davis, Illinois (disaffiliated)
 Tom Davis, Virginia (retired in 2008)
 Jeff Denham, California (lost reelection in 2018)
 Charlie Dent, Pennsylvania (resigned in 2018)
 Lincoln Díaz-Balart, Florida (retired in 2010)
 Charles Djou, Hawaii (lost reelection in 2010)
 Bob Dold, Illinois (lost reelection in 2016)
 Dan Donovan, New York (lost reelection in 2018)
 David Dreier, California (retired in 2012)
 Vern Ehlers, Michigan (retired in 2010)
 Renee Ellmers, North Carolina (lost renomination in 2016)
 Jo Ann Emerson, Missouri (resigned in 2013)
 Phil English, Pennsylvania (lost reelection in 2008)
 John Faso, New York (lost reelection in 2018)
 Mike Fitzpatrick, Pennsylvania (retired in 2016)
 Mark Foley, Florida (resigned in 2006)
 Bob Franks, New Jersey (retired to unsuccessfully run for United States Senate in 2000)
 Rodney Frelinghuysen, New Jersey (retired in 2018)
 Greg Ganske, Iowa (retired to unsuccessfully run for United States Senate in 2002)
 Jim Gerlach, Pennsylvania (retired in 2008)
 Chris Gibson, New York (retired in 2016)
 Bob Gibbs, Ohio (retired in 2022)
 Wayne Gilchrest, Maryland (lost renomination in 2008)
 Paul Gillmor, Ohio (died in 2007)
 Benjamin Gilman, New York (retired in 2002 due to redistricting)
 Anthony Gonzalez, Ohio (retired in 2022)
 Porter Goss, Florida (resigned to become Director of the CIA in 2004)
 Jim Greenwood, Pennsylvania (retired in 2004)
 Frank Guinta, New Hampshire (lost reelection in 2016)
 Karen Handel, Georgia (lost reelection in 2018)
 Richard Hanna, New York (retired in 2016)
 Melissa Hart, Pennsylvania (lost reelection in 2006)
 Nan Hayworth, New York (lost reelection in 2012)
 Joe Heck, Nevada (retired to unsuccessfully run for United States Senate in 2016)
 Jamie Herrera Beutler, Washington (lost renomination in 2022)
 Dave Hobson, Ohio (retired in 2008)
 Steve Horn, California (retired in 2002)
 Amo Houghton, New York (retired in 2004)
 Will Hurd, Texas (retired in 2020)
 Chris Jacobs, New York (retired in 2022)
 Evan Jenkins, West Virginia (retired to unsuccessfully run for United States Senate in 2018, subsequently resigned)
 Lynn Jenkins, Kansas (retired in 2018)
 Nancy Johnson, Connecticut (lost reelection in 2006)
 David Jolly, Florida (lost reelection in 2016)
 John Joyce, Pennsylvania (disaffiliated)
 John Katko, New York (retired in 2022)
 Mike Kelly, Pennsylvania (disaffiliated)
 Sue Kelly, New York (lost reelection in 2006)
 Peter King, New York (retired in 2020)
 Adam Kinzinger, Illinois (retired in 2022)
 Steve Knight, California (lost reelection in 2018)
 Jim Kolbe, Arizona (retired in 2006)
 Randy Kuhl, New York (lost reelection in 2008)
 Ray LaHood, Illinois (retired in 2008)
 Leonard Lance, New Jersey (lost reelection in 2018)
 Steve LaTourette, Ohio (retired in 2012)
 Jim Leach, Iowa (lost reelection in 2006)
 Jerry Lewis, California (retired in 2012)
 Frank LoBiondo, New Jersey (retired in 2018)
 Mia Love, Utah (lost reelection in 2018)
 Tom MacArthur, New Jersey (lost reelection in 2018)
 Jim McCrery, Louisiana (retired in 2008)
 David McKinley, West Virginia (lost renomination in 2022 due to redistricting)
 Peter Meijer Michigan (lost renomination in 2022)
 Jan Meyers, Kansas (retired in 1996)
 Connie Morella, Maryland (lost reelection in 2002 following redistricting)
 George Nethercutt, Washington (retired to unsuccessfully run for United States Senate in 2004)
 Doug Ose, California (retired in 2002)
 Erik Paulsen, Minnesota (lost reelection in 2018)
 Tom Petri, Wisconsin (retired in 2014)
 Todd Platts, Pennsylvania (retired in 2012)
 Bruce Poliquin, Maine (lost reelection in 2018)
 Jon Porter, Nevada (lost reelection in 2008)
 Deborah Pryce, Ohio (retired in 2008)
 Jack Quinn, New York (retired in 2004)
 Jim Ramstad, Minnesota (retired in 2008)
 Tom Reed (NY–23) (announced retirement in 2022, then resigned early)
 Ralph Regula, Ohio (retired in 2008)
 Dave Reichert, Washington (retired in 2018)
 Jim Renacci, Ohio (retired to unsuccessfully run for United States Senate in 2018)
 Scott Rigell, Virginia (retired in 2016)
 Ileana Ros-Lehtinen, Florida (retired in 2018)
 Marge Roukema, New Jersey (retired in 2002)
 Jon Runyan, New Jersey (retired in 2014)
 Jim Saxton, New Jersey (retired in 2008)
 Bobby Schilling, Illinois (lost reelection in 2012)
 Joe Schwarz, Michigan (lost renomination in 2006)
 E. Clay Shaw, Jr., Florida (lost reelection in 2006)
 Chris Shays, Connecticut (lost reelection in 2008)
 Bill Shuster, Pennsylvania (retired in 2018)
 Rob Simmons, Connecticut (lost reelection in 2006)
 Steve Stivers, Ohio (resigned in 2021)
 Scott Taylor, Virginia (lost reelection in 2018)
 Pat Tiberi, Ohio (resigned in 2017)
 Dave Trott, Michigan (retired in 2018)
 Bob Turner, New York (retired to unsuccessfully run for United States Senate in 2012)
 Fred Upton, Michigan (retired in 2022)
 Greg Walden, Oregon (retired in 2020)
 Jim Walsh, New York (retired in 2008)
 Mimi Walters, California (lost reelection in 2018)
 Jerry Weller, Illinois (retired in 2008)
 Ed Whitfield, Kentucky (resigned in 2016)
 Heather Wilson, New Mexico (retired to unsuccessfully run for United States Senate in 2008)
 Frank Wolf, Virginia (retired in 2014)
 Kevin Yoder, Kansas (lost reelection in 2018)
 David Young, Iowa (lost reelection in 2018)
 Lee Zeldin, New York (retired in 2022)
 Ryan Zinke, Montana (resigned to become United States Secretary of the Interior in 2017)

Senators 

 Martha McSally, Arizona (lost re-election in 2020)
 Lincoln Chafee, Rhode Island (lost reelection in 2006, later became an Independent and then a Democrat. In 2019, he switched his party affiliation to Libertarian.)
 Saxby Chambliss, Georgia (retired in 2014)
 Norm Coleman, Minnesota (lost reelection in 2008)
 John Danforth, Missouri (retired in 1994)
 Jim Jeffords, Vermont (became an Independent and caucused with Democrats in 2001, retired in 2006)
 Mark Kirk, Illinois (lost reelection in 2016)
 John McCain, Arizona (died in 2018)
 Warren Rudman, New Hampshire (retired in 1992)
 Gordon Smith, Oregon (lost reelection in 2008)
 Olympia Snowe, Maine (retired in 2012)
 Arlen Specter, Pennsylvania (switched to the Democratic Party, and then lost renomination in 2010)
 Ted Stevens, Alaska (lost reelection in 2008)
 George Voinovich, Ohio (retired in 2010)

See also 
 Blue Dog Coalition
 Freedom Caucus
 Liberty Caucus
 New Democrat Coalition
 Republican Study Committee
 Tea Party Caucus
 Tuesday Group

Notes

References

External links 
 

501(c)(4) nonprofit organizations
Main Street Partnership
Centrism in the United States
Centrist political advocacy groups in the United States
Factions in the Republican Party (United States)